Godefroi, Comte d'Estrades (1607 – February 26, 1686) was a French diplomat and marshal.

Biography
D'Estrades was born in Agen. He became a page to Louis XIII, and at the age of nineteen was sent on a mission to Maurice of Holland.

In 1646 d'Estrades was named ambassador extraordinary to Holland, and took part in the conferences at Münster. Sent in 1661 to England, he obtained in 1662 the restitution of Dunkirk. In 1667 he negotiated the Treaty of Breda with the king of Denmark, and in 1678 the Treaty of Nijmwegen, which ended the war with Holland. Independently of these diplomatic missions, he took part in the principal campaigns of Louis XIV, in Italy (1648), in Catalonia (1655), in Holland (1672); and was created marshal of France in 1675. He left Lettres, memoires et négociations en qual d'ambassadeur en Hollande depuis 1663 jusqu'en 1668, of which the first edition in 1709 was followed by a nine-volume edition (London (the Hague), 1743).

Family
Of the sons of Godefroi d'Estrades,  was ambassador to Venice and Piedmont; Louis, marquis d'Estrades (died 1711), succeeded his father as governor of Dunkirk, and was the father of Godefroi Louis, comte d'Estrades (died 1717), lieutenant-general, who was killed at the siege of Belgrade.

See also 
 Marshals of France

Notes

References

External links 

17th-century French diplomats
Ambassadors of France to the Netherlands
People from Agen
1607 births
1686 deaths
Marshals of France